A humanoid is any being whose body structure resembles that of a human (e.g. bipedal).

Humanoid may also refer to:
 hominid, family of apes that includes eight extant species
 Humanoid robot, non-fictional robots

Arts, entertainment, and media

Films and television
 The Creation of the Humanoids, a 1962 film based on the novel
 Humanoids from the Deep, a 1980 monster movie
 Humanoids from the Deep (1996 film), a 1996 film remake 
 The Humanoid (film), a 1979 film directed by Aldo Lado
 Humanoid Monster Bem, Japanese anime television series

Music
 Humanoid (album), a 2009 album by German rock band Tokio Hotel
 Humanoid City Live, a 2010 live album by German band Tokio Hotel
 Humanoids (album), 2012 album by South Korean pop duo TVXQ
 "Humanoid", a song on the 2007 Chevelle album Vena Sera
 Humanoid (band), the name used for early releases by Brian Dougans

Other uses
 The Humanoids, a 1948 novel by Jack Williamson
 Humanoids Publishing, a comic book publisher
 Humanoid Robotics Project, project for development of general domestic helper robots
 Humanoid animation, standard for humanoid modeling and animation

See also
 Lists of humanoids
 "Stakker Humanoid", a 1988 track by Humanoid
 "Genocidal Humanoidz", a 2020 song by System of a Down